Avalon State Park is a Florida State Park, located on North Hutchinson Island, 4 miles north of Fort Pierce Inlet State Park, along A1A.

Admission and Hours
Florida state parks are open between 8 a.m. and sundown every day of the year (including holidays).

References

External links

 Avalon State Park at Florida State Parks
 Avalon State Park at State Parks
 Avalon State Park at Wildernet

State parks of Florida
Parks in St. Lucie County, Florida